Ronald William Furlong (born 16 May 1936) is an Australian former cricketer. He played 31 first-class cricket matches for Victoria between 1957 and 1963.

See also
 List of Victoria first-class cricketers

References

External links
 

1936 births
Living people
Australian cricketers
Victoria cricketers
Sportspeople from Ballarat